Jenny Zillhardt or Marguerite Valentine (16 March 1857 – February 1939) was a French painter.

Biography
Marguerite-Valentine-Jenny Zillhardt (Jenny Zillhardt) was born at Saint-Quentin in Aisne. She began studying painting at the Académie Julian in Paris in 1877, alongside Louise Catherine Breslau and Marie Bashkirtseff. She studied under Tony Robert-Fleury.

She first exhibited at the Paris Salon in 1878 with Deux amis. From that time forward, her frequent participation in the Salon garnered her several sales.

Zillhardt was part of the French female group who were represented at the 1893 Chicago World's Fair, an exhibit in the Woman's Building.

Her works were included in the collections of the Musée d'Orsay, the museum of Langres, and the museum of Saint-Quentin.

She was made an officer of public instruction (officier de l'instruction publique) in 1910, and received the Legion of Honor (chevalier de la légion d'honneur) in 1930.

Her painting Régalez-vous mesdames was included in the 1905 work of British art historian Walter Shaw Sparrow, Women Painters of the World.

Zillhardt died in February 1939 at Neuilly-sur-Seine.

She was the sister of Madeleine Zillhardt, model and companion of Louise Catherine Breslau.

Collections
Zillhardt's work is held in the following public collection:
 Jeune fille au chat, musée d'Orsay

Gallery

References

External links
Zillhardt on artnet

1857 births
1939 deaths
19th-century French painters
French women painters
19th-century French women artists
20th-century French painters
20th-century French women artists
Académie Julian